Benedict Arnold (1741–1801) was an American Revolution general who defected from the American to the British side.

Benedict Arnold may also refer to:
Benedict Arnold (congressman) (1780–1849), American politician from New York
Benedict Arnold (governor) (1615–1678), early governor of the Rhode Island colony and great grandfather of General Benedict Arnold

See also
Ben Arnold (disambiguation)
Benjamin Arnold (disambiguation)
Arnold (surname)